Rabanal may refer to:

Rabanal (surname)
Rabanal, Cidra, Puerto Rico

See also
 Rabana (disambiguation)